"What You Need" is a song recorded by the Australian band INXS. It is the leadoff track from their 1985 album, Listen Like Thieves. "What You Need" was the lead single off the album in Australia and New Zealand, while it was in USA and Europe the second single after "This Time" and was the band's first American Top Ten hit, peaking at #5 on the Billboard Hot 100 singles chart.

After the album Listen Like Thieves was recorded and ready to be given to the record label for inspection, producer Chris Thomas was worried that the album didn't have a "hit". As Andrew Farriss recalled in a 2005 interview; "'What You Need' is another example of a huge hit that essentially took no time at all. We'd already finished the Listen Like Thieves album but Chris Thomas (the producer) told us there was still no "hit". We left the studio that night knowing we had one day left and we had to deliver "a hit". Talk about pressure. The band's performance on that track is amazing. We absolutely nailed it."

A remixed version of "What You Need" was featured in the soundtrack of sports video game FIFA Football 2005.

Music video
The music video for the song was created using an animation technique known as rotoscope. At the Countdown Music and Video Awards for 1985, the award for Best Video for "What You Need" by INXS was shared by Richard Lowenstein and Lynn-Maree Milburn.

Track listing
UK 7" INXS 12
 "What You Need" – 3:35
 "Sweet As Sin" – 2:20

UK 12" single INXS 512
 "What You Need" (Remix) – 5:35 (Remix: Nick Launay)
 "Sweet As Sin" – 2:21
 "What You Need" (Live) – 3:56
 "The One Thing" (Live) – 3:31

Chart performance

Weekly charts

Year-end charts

Notable appearances in other media
 This song played in an episode of the American crime drama series Miami Vice on 2 May 1986.
 This song played in an episode of the British soap opera series Coronation Street in May 1986. 
 This song played in the HBO original movie Hysterical Blindness in 2002.
 This song played in the American crime drama movie Monster in 2003.
 This song played in the American sci-fi comedy movie Hot Tub Time Machine in 2010.
 This song played in the American romantic comedy-drama Take Me Home Tonight in 2011.
 This song played in an episode of the Netflix original series Sex Education (TV series) in 2019.

References

INXS songs
1986 singles
APRA Award winners
Songs written by Andrew Farriss
Songs written by Michael Hutchence
Song recordings produced by Chris Thomas (record producer)
1985 songs
Atlantic Records singles